Dana Kirk may refer to:
 Dana Kirk (basketball) (1936–2010), American college basketball coach
 Dana Kirk (swimmer) (born 1984), American Olympic swimmer